Shailer Mathews (1863–1941) was an American liberal Christian theologian, involved with the Social Gospel movement.

Career

Born on May 26, 1863, in Portland, Maine, and graduated from Colby College. Mathews was a progressive, advocating social concerns as part of the Social Gospel message, and subjecting biblical texts to scientific study, in opposition to contemporary conservative Christians. He incorporated evolutionary theory into his religious views, noting that the two were not mutually exclusive. He remained a devout Baptist for his entire life, and helped establish the Northern Baptist Convention, serving as its president in 1915. Mathews was a prolific author, served as president of the Chicago Society of Biblical Research twice (in 1898–1899 and 1928–1929), and also served as dean of the Divinity School of the University of Chicago (from 1908 to 1933). An endowed chair in his honor, the Shailer Mathews Professorship at the University of Chicago Divinity School, has recently been held by Franklin I. Gamwell and Hans Dieter Betz, and is currently held by Margaret M. Mitchell. He died on October 23, 1941. His ashes are interred in the crypt of First Unitarian Church of Chicago.

Select publications
 The Social Teachings of Jesus, 1897
 A History of New Testament Times in Palestine, 1899
 The French Revolution, 1900
 The Messianic Hope in the New Testament, 1905
 The Church and the Changing Order, 1907
 The Social Gospel, 1909
 The Gospel and the modern Man, 1910
 The Social Teaching of Jesus, 1910
 Scientific Management in Churches, 1911
 The Individual and the Social Gospel, 1914
 The Spiritual Interpretation of History, 1916
 Patriotism and Religion, 1918
 The Validity of American Ideals, 1922
 The Faith of Modernism, 1924
 Jesus on Social Institutions, 1928
 The Atonement and the Social Process, 1930
 The Growth of the Idea of God, 1931
 Immortality and the Cosmic Process, 1933
 Christianity and Social Process, 1934
 Creative Christianity, 1935
 New Faith for Old: An Autobiography, 1936
 The Church and the Christian, 1938
 Is God Emeritus? 1940

See also
 Ernest DeWitt Burton

References

Footnotes

Bibliography

External links
Photograph of Shailer Mathews
Mathews House
History of New Testament Times in Palestine Macmillan Company, 1899
Guide to the Shailer Mathews Papers 1892-1942 at the University of Chicago Special Collections Research Center

1863 births
1941 deaths
Writers from Portland, Maine
American theologians
American biblical scholars
American historians of religion
Colby College alumni
Colby College faculty
University of Chicago Divinity School faculty
Baptist ministers from the United States
Theistic evolutionists